New Republic Party may refer to:

 New Republic Party (South Africa), a former political party in South Africa
 New Republic (Romania), a political party in Romania
 New Republic Party (Costa Rica), a political party in Costa Rica

See also

 New Republican Party (Malawi), a political party
 New Republican Force (Bolivia), a political party
 Union for the New Republic (France), a political party
 Union for the New Republic (Gabon), a political party
 Union for the New Republic (Guinea), a political party
 Democratic Union for the New Republic (Italy), a political party
 New Republic (disambiguation)
 Republican Party (disambiguation)